The 2016 Rangitikei local elections were held across the Rangitikei District of Manawatū-Whanganui, New Zealand, between 16 September and 8 October. These elections were for the offices of Mayor of Rangitikei, eleven members of the Rangitikei District Council, four members each of two community boards, two members of the Horizons Regional Council and seven members of the Whanganui District Health Board; these elections were part of the New Zealand-wide local elections. Postal ballots will be issued to all registered voters.

The incumbent mayor was Andy Watson, who on 9 June announced his intention on seeking re-election. First past the post (FPP) was to be used for all elections except the District Health Board elections which used single transferable vote (STV).

The previous elections took place in October 2013 and the following will take place in October 2019.

Dates
Following are the key dates for the local elections:

Mayor

The incumbent Mayor of Rangitikei was Andy Watson, first elected in 2013. Watson sought re-election and contested the election along with community patrol chair George London and civil engineer Rob Snijders.

Incumbent mayor Watson was declared re-elected on 13 October 2016.

District council

Bulls ward
The Bulls ward elected two councillors. The incumbent councillors were Tim Harris and Rebecca McNeil. Harris and McNeil both sought re-election.

Both incumbents lost re-election to new candidates Platt and Dunn.

Hunterville ward
The Hunterville ward elected one councillor. The incumbent councillor is Dean McManaway, the deputy mayor. McManaway, who was elected unopposed in 2013, was elected unopposed for a second consecutive time in 2016.

Marton ward
The Marton ward elected four councillors. The incumbent councillors were Cath Ash, Nigel Belsham, Mike Jones and Lynne Sheridan. Ash, Belsham and Sheridan sought re-election; Jones retired from politics.

Belsham, Sheridan and Ash were all re-elected; Dave Wilson was elected.

Taihape ward
The Taihape ward elected three councillors. The incumbent councillors were Richard Aslett, Angus Gordon and Ruth Rainey. All three incumbents are seeking re-election.

All three incumbents were re-elected.

Turakina ward
The Turakina ward elected one councillor. The incumbent councillor is Soraya Peke-Mason. Peke-Mason, who was elected unopposed in 2013, was elected unopposed for a second consecutive term.

Community boards

Ratana Community Board
The Ratana Community Board is composed of four members. The incumbent members were Maata Kare Thompson, Nadine Rawhiti, Bjorn Barlien and Tama Biddle.

Thompson was re-elected and Rawhiti lost her seat. Charlie Mete, Charlie Rourangi and Thomas Tautaurangi were also elected.

Taihape Community Board
The Taihape Community Board is composed of four members. The incumbent members were Michelle Fannin, Gail Larsen, Peter Oliver and Yvonne Sicely. Fannin, Larsen and Sicely were re-elected unopposed and Ann Abernathy was elected unopposed also.

Regional election
As part of the Manawatū-Whanganui region, Rangitikei electors form part of the Manawatu-Rangitikei constituency of the Horizons Regional Council. This constituency elects two members. The incumbent councillors were chairman Bruce Gordon and Gordon McKellar. Both incumbents were re-elected unopposed.

District health board election
Rangitikei District is part of the Whanganui District Health Board (WDHB), one of 20 district health boards in New Zealand. The WDHB consists of seven elected members and up to four members appointed by the Minister of Health. The incumbent elected members were Allan Anderson, Philippa Baker-Hogan, Jenny Duncan, Kate Joblin, Judith MacDonald and Ray Stevens. Baker-Hogan, Duncan, MacDonald and Stevens are running for re-election, with eleven other candidates running including incumbent Mayor of Whanganui Annette Main.

Baker-Hogan, Duncan and MacDonald were re-elected; Stevens lost re-election. Annette Main, Charlie Anderson, Graham Adams, and Stuart Hylton were also elected. This election used the single transferable vote (STV) electoral system.

See also
2013 Rangitikei local elections
2016 Rangitikei mayoral election
2016 New Zealand local elections

References

External links
2016 elections information on the Rangitikei District Council website
2016 elections information on the Electoral Commission website

Rangitikei
Politics of Rangitikei
Rangitikei